is a Japanese manga series written by Homura Kawamoto and illustrated by Kei Saiki. It is both a spin-off and a prequel to Kakegurui – Compulsive Gambler, which is written by Kawamoto and illustrated by Tōru Naomura. It has been serialized in publisher Square Enix's Gangan Joker magazine since September 2015, with its individual chapters collected and published by Square Enix in thirteen tankōbon volumes as of September 2022. The manga has been licensed for English-language release in North America by Yen Press. An original net animation series by MAPPA was released on Netflix in August 2022.

Synopsis

Setting 
Kakegurui Twin takes place a year before the events of the main series and the arrival of Yumeko Jabami at Hyakkaou Private Academy.

Premise 
The series focuses on transfer student Mary Saotome who, after joining Hyakkaou Private Academy, learns about the school's gambling system and quickly begins to adapt to it, which only causes Mary to succumb to the gambling mania that she comes to be known for.

Cast

Media

Manga 

Written by Homura Kawamoto and illustrated by Kei Saiki, Kakegurui Twin began its serialization in Square Enix's Gangan Joker on September 19, 2015. Its chapters are collected and published by Square Enix into individual tankōbon volumes. The first volume was published on September 22, 2015, and thirteen volumes have been released as of September 22, 2022. The manga has been licensed by Yen Press for English-language release in North America.

Web series 
A 8-episode live-action web series adaptation was released on Amazon Prime from March 26 to April 16, 2021.

Anime 
In November 2021, it was announced that the series will receive an original net animation series adaptation by MAPPA. It is directed by Kaori Makita, with chief direction by Yuichiro Hayashi, scripts written by Shigeru Murakoshi, character designs handled by Manabu Nii, and music composed by Technoboys Pulcraft Green-Fund. The series premiered on Netflix on August 4, 2022. The ending theme song is "Queens Bluff" by Iris.

Reception 
Shaenon K. Garrity of Otaku USA commented how Kakegurui Twin is the perfect manga for "readers who are equally interested in introductory game theory mathematics and kink". Similarly, Alan Sahbegovic of Sportskeeda praised the anime, stating "Its strengths are good enough to make the series a worthwhile watch, even if somebody might not have seen the original series this spinoff is based on."

Notes

References

External links 
  
 
 

2022 anime ONAs
Anime and manga about gambling
Gangan Comics manga
Japanese-language Netflix original programming
Manga series
MAPPA
Netflix original anime
Shōnen manga
Yen Press titles